Corbières-en-Provence (literally Corbières in Provence), simply known as Corbières until 2018, is a commune in the Alpes-de-Haute-Provence department in the Provence-Alpes-Côte d'Azur region of Southeastern France. In 2018, it had a population of 1,196. Its inhabitants are called Corbiérains (masculine) and Corbiéraines (feminine).

Corbières-en-Provence is located at the heart of the Provence historical province, on the departmental border with Vaucluse and Var, not far north from Bouches-du-Rhône, where the Verdon flows into the Durance. The commune itself is situated on the Durance, the banks of which are served by the A51 autoroute, nicknamed the "Autoroute du Val de Durance".

Demographics

See also
 Coteaux de Pierrevert AOC
 Communes of the Alpes-de-Haute-Provence department

References

Communes of Alpes-de-Haute-Provence